Northampton Demons is a rugby league club based in Duston, Northampton. They play in the RFL Midlands Rugby League Men's South Division.

History

Background - Nene Valley and Northampton Knights
Nene Valley were set up in 1989 and they trained twice weekly at Rushden Sports Centre. The club joined the Midlands and South West Amateur Rugby League Association (MASWARLA) and the Eastern Counties Rugby League (ECRL). Nene Valley became Northampton Knights.

In September 1994 Northampton Knights team entered the National Conference League Division 2 having finished mid-table in the old East Midlands League. The team was coached by Paul Johnstone. The club started off playing at Dallington Park but moved to the then council-owned Sixfields Stadium. The club played 21 games from its fixture list of 22 but lost  them all. They scored 185 points and conceded 1,170.

In line with talk of mergers in the professional game moves were afoot to create a regional side based on Peterborough and Leicester with the aim of creating a stronger side. However, due to administrative and travel issues amongst players and staff the plans for the East Midlands Knights were shelved. Northampton Knights played 5 games in the 1995/6 season before dropping out of NCL Division 2 in November 1995 and subsequently folding.

In 1998 an application to the Rugby League Conference was made but they withdrew before the season started on the basis that the club's organisation was not up to scratch. In 2005 another application was made from a group that included ex-students from the town's university but they never made it onto the playing field, despite being accepted for the 2006 season.

Northampton Casuals
In late 2006 a number of articles were placed on various websites about the formation of the rugby league team in the town and offers of assistance were received from Coventry Bears and three other rugby league enthusiasts in Northampton. The founding members met in March 2007 and put in place a plan to set up a team based at the nearby Casuals rugby union club. The name Northampton Casuals was taken from the rugby union club they were based in.

As soon as the rugby union season ended, training began for the newly formed team with 18 players attending the first session from local union clubs and the University of Northampton rugby league side.

The club was accepted into the London League which operates on a Merit League basis. Geographically Northampton is some distance from the London teams and due to this fact played fixtures against teams from the RL Merit League, for example Nottingham Outlaws.

The club played its first fixture on 13 May 2007, after four training sessions, against a development team from Bedford Tigers losing 56-12. This was the first time rugby league had been played in Northampton by a non-university side since the mid-1990s. Indeed one of the players from that era, Mick Bryant, had joined the newly formed team. Two weeks later the team recorded its first victory over St Albans Centurions second team. The club went on to play a further six fixtures in 2007. A victory, a draw and four defeats were the results of those games but the club had been established in the town.

The club joined the Eastern Division of the 2008 Rugby League Conference. In March 2008, Chris Ashton, current Northampton Saints and ex-Wigan Warriors player, hosted a training session for both the adult and junior players. This event helped to further raise the profile of the club and the event was featured in all the local press and the regional news programmes on BBC and ITV.

They won the division in 2009, beat Devon Sharks in a semi-final held at the Stoop and went on to win the RLC Regional title by beating Jarrow Vikings.

In 2010, Northampton linked up with Super League side Harlequins RL and adopted the name, Northampton Demons to create a separate identity.

Since 2010, the clubs has won the Midland Premier twice, played in the Conference South and moved home to Duston Sports Centre in the town.

Juniors
Following the distributing of the leaflets at the Northampton Saints rugby union game, a parent whose child plays rugby union, contacted Andrew to see if his and other children could play rugby league. Junior development wasn't in the original remit of the club but seeing a great opportunity to grow the club the children joined the club.

As a result 20 juniors are now training and playing rugby league in Northampton.  The culmination of this was their entry into the Birmingham Junior rugby league festival in July 2007 where teams at the under-11 and under-13 age groups played against teams from Coventry Bears, Derby City, Nottingham Outlaws, Telford Raiders and Birmingham Bulldogs.

Northampton now enter teams in the Midlands Junior League and the Chilterns Junior League under the name Northampton Knights and Northampton Patriots. Northampton Knights have under-11, under-12, under-14 and under-16 teams whilst Northampton Patriots are second teams at under 14 and under-16 level.

Developing Midlands Rugby League
Far too often teams in development areas fail due to the distances involved in playing matches. The Midlands has a large number of teams: Coventry, Derby, Leicester, Nottingham, Telford, Redditch, Birmingham, Wolverhampton and Burntwood. They are all playing their trade in the Rugby League Conference.  The sustainability of these clubs is vital if other clubs are to form in the Midlands.

Future
The Junior section did not have any teams for 2014 but there are firm plans in place to field a u17 and u15 teams in the Midlands Junior leagues. These leagues are Merit based so the club can play teams from other regions.

In 2018 the club folded due to low player numbers.

Club honours
 RLC East Division: 2009, 2010
 RLC Regional: 2009, 2010
 Midlands Rugby League Premier Division: 2012, 2014 and 2015

External links
 Rugby League Conference
 Midlands Rugby League
 London Rugby League
 Rugby Football League

Rugby League Conference teams
Sport in Northampton
2007 establishments in England
Rugby clubs established in 2007
Rugby league teams in Northamptonshire
English rugby league teams